The 1978–79 snooker season was a series of snooker tournaments played between August 1978 and June 1979. The following table outlines the results for the ranking and the invitational events.


Calendar

Official rankings 

The top 16 of the world rankings.

Notes

References

External links 
 

1978
Season 1979
Season 1978